Arenopsaltria is a genus of true bugs belonging to the family Cicadidae.

The species of this genus are found in Australia.

Species:

Arenopsaltria fullo 
Arenopsaltria nubivena 
Arenopsaltria pygmaea

References

Cicadidae